The following is a list of business schools in Canada, organized by province.

Alberta

British Columbia

Manitoba

New Brunswick

Newfoundland and Labrador

Nova Scotia

Ontario

Prince Edward Island

Quebec

Saskatchewan 

 
Canada